Spain competed at the 2015 World Championships in Athletics in Beijing, China, from 22–30 August 2015.

Medalists 
The following competitors from Spain won medals at the Championships

Results

Men
Track & road events

Field events

Combined events – Decathlon

Women
Track & road events

On 22 August 2015 it was reported that Josephine Onyia had tested positive for anabolic steroids at the Spanish athletics championships and that she had been pulled from the World Championships.

Field events

Key
Note–Ranks given for track events are within the athlete's heat only
Q = Qualified for the next round
q = Qualified for the next round as a fastest loser or, in field events, by position without achieving the qualifying target
NR = National record
N/A = Round not applicable for the event
Bye = Athlete not required to compete in round

References

External links
 

Nations at the 2015 World Championships in Athletics
World Championships in Athletics
Spain at the World Championships in Athletics